Winchester (also known as Winchester: The House That Ghosts Built) is a 2018 supernatural horror film directed by Michael and Peter Spierig, and written by the Spierigs and Tom Vaughan. The film stars Helen Mirren as heiress Sarah Winchester, with Jason Clarke and Sarah Snook, and follows Winchester as she is haunted by spirits inside her San Jose mansion in 1906.

An American-Australian co-production, the film was released in the United States on February 2, 2018 and in Australia on February 22, 2018. The film received negative reviews from critics, who called it "dull" and "pointless”, but was a box office success, grossing $44 million worldwide against a $3.5 million budget. At the 39th Golden Raspberry Awards, the film was nominated in four categories, including Worst Picture and Worst Actress for Mirren, but failed to "win" any awards.

Plot 
Sarah Winchester is the widow of famed gun manufacturer William Wirt Winchester. Her husband's sudden death and the previous death of their child Annie have left her in grief. Having received more than twenty million dollars in inheritance, Winchester convinces herself she is cursed by the ghosts of those who died at the hands of Winchester firearms. After seeking advice from a medium, she begins building an enormous, seemingly never-ending mansion in San Jose, California that would eventually be named the Winchester Mystery House. The house is under constant construction and Sarah's niece Marion Marriott lives in the house with her son Henry. At night, Henry is possessed by a mysterious entity.

In 1906, the Winchester company hires Doctor Eric Price to stay at the house and assess Sarah, believing she is mentally unfit to remain in charge of the company. Eric is grieving from the death of his wife Ruby and is reliant on drugs. He arrives at the house and has a ghostly vision that he believes is a side-effect of the drugs he has taken. Later, he spots a ghost in the basement and witnesses a possessed Henry jump off the roof. Eric saves him.

The next day, Eric begins to conduct his assessment of Sarah's mental well-being. Sarah admits her fear of ghosts and believes she can help them move on. She reveals that she knows about Eric's drug problem and confiscates his supply of laudanum. That night, Eric witnesses a seemingly possessed Sarah draw a plan for a new room. He is startled by an entity and flees back to his room. The next day, Sarah shows Eric that she keeps records of people killed by Winchester rifles. It is revealed that Eric had actually been shot and killed by a Winchester rifle before being revived, and he keeps the refurbished bullet with him. Sarah explains how thirteen nails keep spirits sealed in rooms.

A possessed Henry attempts to kill Sarah with a rifle, but is stopped by Eric and Marion. Realizing how violent this spirit is, Sarah sends her staff away and decides to personally remove the ghost from her home. Eric encounters a butler who reveals himself to be a ghost. He and Sarah identify the ghost as Benjamin Block, a Confederate States Army soldier who lost his two brothers in the American Civil War, killed by Winchester rifles. A devastated Ben proceeded to shoot up a Winchester office, massacring the workers before being shot dead by police. Ben has been the one possessing Henry; the constructed room with the Winchester guns is the room where he was shot dead.

The 1906 San Francisco earthquake takes place, devastating the house and separating Eric and Sarah. In the chaos, a possessed Henry escapes his room and is pursued by Marion. Eric encounters several ghosts before seeing the ghost of Ruby his wife. It is revealed that Ruby could see and hear ghosts but was misdiagnosed as "delusional" by Eric. Depressed that he would not believe her, the unstable Ruby shot Eric before killing herself with a Winchester rifle. Ruby's ghost comforts Eric, inspiring him to help Sarah. Eric reunites with Sarah and they manage to trap Ben in the room. Marion and Henry are cornered by Ben's brothers. Ben attempts to murder Sarah, but the pair realizes that Ben is scared of the bullet Eric kept. Eric has been able to see the ghosts in the house due to his dying from that bullet beforehand. Eric uses the bullet in the rifle that Ben used in the shooting and banishes him. Henry and Marion are saved and the other spirits return to their rooms.

Eric pronounces Sarah sane, allowing her to remain in control of the company. Sarah announces her intent to build more rooms to help more spirits. As the house is being repaired, the camera returns to view the hall of boarded up rooms and catches a nail falling out of one of the boards that is sealing a spirit in a room.

Cast

Production 
In 2009, it was announced that a film would be made about the Winchester Mystery House. Rights to the story were acquired by the Hammer Films division of Exclusive Media in 2012, with Imagination Design Works and Nine/8 Entertainment producing. Michael and Peter Spierig were set as directors on May 10, 2016, with the pair also revising the script. On May 14, Helen Mirren began finalizing a deal to star in the film as heiress Sarah Winchester, and filming was expected to start later in 2016, in San Jose, California and Australia. In August 2016, CBS Films acquired distribution rights to the film, and production was pushed back to March 2017. In September 2016, Jason Clarke entered negotiations to star in the film. Sarah Snook and Angus Sampson joined the cast in March 2017, and filming commenced in Australia. The film was originally going to be released on February 23, 2018, but the release date was moved up to February 2, 2018.

Reception

Box office
Winchester grossed $25.1 million in the United States and Canada, and $20.9 million in other territories, for a worldwide total of $46 million, against a production budget of $3.5 million.

In the United States and Canada, Winchester was released on
February 2, 2018, and was expected to gross $6–8 million from 2,480 theaters in its opening weekend. It ended up debuting to $9.3 million, finishing third at the box office, behind holdovers Jumanji: Welcome to the Jungle and Maze Runner: The Death Cure.

Critical response
The website's critical consensus reads, "Like a grand staircase within the famous mansion that inspired it, Winchester appears poised to get a rise out of audiences, but ultimately leads nowhere." At Metacritic, the film received a weighted average score of 28 out of 100, based on 18 critics, indicating "generally unfavorable reviews". Audiences polled by CinemaScore gave the film an average grade of "B−" on an A+ to F scale.

Varietys Owen Gleiberman gave the film a negative review, writing, "Mirren does all she can to look like she’s having fun, but Winchester...[is] an empty grab bag of a spook show in which the Spierig brothers never do figure out a way to turn the Winchester Mystery House into an exhilarating movie set...".

Stephen Dalton of The Hollywood Reporter gave the film a mixed review, saying that "Winchester is a visual treat, its palette aglow with bronze and turquoise tints that suggest colorized Victorian postcards," but "it "promises more sophisticated shocks and psychological depths than it ultimately delivers."

Simon Abrams of RogerEbert.com gave the film three out of four stars, stating, "Winchester leveled my unfair expectations simply by being both silly and fun... what [it] lacks in originality its creators amply make up for in execution." He also stated that the dialogue was "enjoyable."

In January 2019, it was nominated for several Razzie Awards, including Worst Picture and Worst Actress.

Accolades

References

External links 
 
 
 
 
 
 
 

2018 horror thriller films
2018 films
2018 horror films
American haunted house films
American thriller films
Australian thriller films
American supernatural horror films
Supernatural thriller films
Horror films based on actual events
Films set in 1906
Films set in California
Films set in country houses
Films set in San Jose, California
Films shot in Melbourne
CBS Films films
2010s English-language films
2010s American films